= Söderhöjdens BK =

Former sports club in Söderhöjden, Sweden

- Full name: Söderhöjdens bollkubb
- Sport: association football, bandy
- Founded: 1971
- Folded: ?
- Based in: Stockholm, Sweden

Söderhöjdens BK was a sports club in Stockholm, Sweden. Established in 1971. it played three seasons in the Swedish women's bandy top division.
